Harriet Tyce (born November 1972) is a Scottish barrister and novelist, the author of Blood Orange (2019), The Lies you Told (2020) and It ends at midnight (2022).

Tyce was at first educated in Edinburgh, before gaining admission to Oxford University to study English literature, and then completing a law conversion course at City University. For nearly ten years she practised as a criminal barrister before changing her career path to creative writing and crime fiction. Her first novel became a Richard and Judy choice and according to Amazon, it became popular during the COVID-19 lockdowns in 2020.

Early and education
Harriet Tyce was born in November 1972 and grew up in Edinburgh, the eldest of two children of Lord Nimmo Smith, retired judge, and Jennifer, an academic and classicist. In Edinburgh, she at first attended an all girls school where she became friends with Sarah Hughes. Subsequently she joined the Edinburgh Academy for sixth form, which was mixed.

Tyce gained admission to Oxford University, where she studied English literature, and then completed a law conversion course at City University.

Career
For around ten years she practised as a criminal barrister. In 2005, after attempting to work part-time and not long after her son was born, she left the Bar. Later she completed a masters in creative writing and crime fiction at the University of East Anglia, passing with distinction. 

After several rejections she acquired an agent and a book deal with Wildfire, an imprint of Headline. They published Blood Orange (2019), her first novel. It became a Richard and Judy choice. According to Amazon, the book became popular during the COVID-19 lockdowns in 2020. Quibi and World Productions, the producers of Line of Duty and Bodyguard, chose Blood Orange for development into a TV series.

After abandoning a second novel, she released The Lies you Told in 2020. Her book It ends at midnight was released in 2022.

She wrote the introductory chapter to Holding Tight, Letting Go (2022).

Personal and family
Tyce lives with her husband, who works in finance. They have two children.

Bibliography

References

1972 births
Living people
People educated at Edinburgh Academy
Alumni of the University of Oxford
Alumni of City, University of London
Alumni of the University of East Anglia
Scottish barristers
British thriller writers
British women writers